Harold Vautin Fare (1 May 1896 – 12 August 1963) was an English footballer who played in the Football League for Wigan Borough and Bury. Born in Wallasey, Fare started his career at Everton before joining Wigan in May 1922. He was a near ever-present during his three seasons at Wigan, making 112 league appearances, and was the club's regular penalty taker, with nine of his 12 goals being converted from the spot. He left the club in May 1925 and joined Bury, but only made two more appearances in the league before dropping into non-league football in 1927.

References

1896 births
1963 deaths
English footballers
Association football defenders
Wigan Borough F.C. players
English Football League players
Bury F.C. players
Flint Town United F.C. players
Stalybridge Celtic F.C. players
Everton F.C. players